Abhijeet Mohan Warang (born 16 April 1983) known professionally as Abhijeet Warang is an Indian film director, actor and screenwriter. He made his directorial debut with the Indian Marathi language drama Picasso (film) in 2021. and won the 2021. 67th National Film Awards-National Film Award – Special Mention (feature film).

Early life and background 

Abhijeet attended Veermata Jijabai Technological Institute College in Mumbai, Maharashtra. He has two children daughter Reva Warang And Son Hriyansh Warang.

Career 
An obsessive love for storytelling and nuanced performance has brought ABHIJEET WARANG where he is. A seasoned theatre writer-director with a four year long Assistant Director stint at UTV Software & Communication Pvt Ltd and over twelve years of experience in film production (including titles like Joshi Ki Kamble (Marathi, 2008), Nirmalya (Marathi, 2010) and 2019 British Feature The Warrior Queen of Jhansi , he has also helmed several top-of-the-line, pan India TVCs as Line Producer for firms such as Black Box Films Chennai, Thinkpot Films Bangalore, Neonlight Pictures, River Bank, Boot Polissh Films, Tubelight Films, Equinox Films and Melting Clock Films.

Filmography

Feature films

References

External links 
 
    National Film Awards Winners List
 
 
 

Film directors from Maharashtra
Living people
Marathi film directors
Indian male screenwriters
Director whose film won the Best Debut Feature Film National Film Award
21st-century Indian film directors
Hindi-language film directors
Marathi screenwriters
Marathi film producers
Film directors from Mumbai
1983 births